Saint Petersburg – second-largest city in Russia. An important Russian port on the Baltic Sea, it has the status of a federal subject (a federal city). Its name was changed to "Petrograd" in 1914, then to "Leningrad" in 1924, and back to Saint Petersburg in 1991.

General reference 
 Pronunciation:;
 Common English name(s): Saint Petersburg
 Official English name(s): Saint Petersburg
 Adjectival(s): Saint Petersburgian
 Demonym(s): Saint Petersburgian, (Saint) Petersburger

Geography of Saint Petersburg 

Geography of Saint Petersburg
 Saint Petersburg is:
 a city
 a federal  city
 Population of Saint Petersburg: 5,323,300
 Area of Saint Petersburg: 1,439 km2 (556 sq mi)
 Atlas of Saint Petersburg

Location of Saint Petersburg 

 Saint Petersburg is situated within the following regions:
 Northern Hemisphere and Eastern Hemisphere
 Eurasia
 Europe (outline)
 Eastern Europe
 Russia (outline)
 Northwestern Federal District
 Time zone(s): Moscow Time (UTC+03)

Environment of Saint Petersburg 

 Climate of Saint Petersburg

Natural geographic features of Saint Petersburg 

 Canals in Saint Petersburg
 Griboyedov Canal
 Ligovsky Canal
 Obvodny Canal
 Winter Canal

 Hills in Saint Petersburg
 Duderhof Heights
 Pulkovo Heights

 Islands in Saint Petersburg
 Aptekarsky Island
 Dekabristov Island
 Hare Island
 Kamenny Islands
 Krestovsky Island
Yelagin Island
 Kotlin Island
 New Holland Island
 Petrogradsky Island
 Vasilyevsky Island

 Lakes in Saint Petersburg
 Lakhtinsky Razliv
 Ligovsky Pond

 Rivers in Saint Petersburg
 Izhora River
 Karpovka River
 Moyka River
 Neva River
Bolshaya Neva River
Bolshaya Nevka River
Fontanka River
Malaya Neva
 Okhta River
 Sestra River

Areas of Saint Petersburg 

Districts of Saint Petersburg
 Central Saint Petersburg

Locations in Saint Petersburg 

 Tourist attractions in Saint Petersburg
 Museums in Saint Petersburg
 Shopping areas and markets
 World Heritage Sites in Saint Petersburg
Historic Centre of Saint Petersburg and Related Groups of Monuments

Bridges in Saint Petersburg 

Bridges in Saint Petersburg
 Anichkov Bridge
 Bank Bridge
 Bolsheokhtinsky Bridge
 Bolshoy Obukhovsky Bridge
 Bridge of Four Lions
 Egyptian Bridge
 English Bridge
 Exchange Bridge
 Finland Railway Bridge
 Hermitage Bridge
 Italian Bridge
 Lazarevskiy Bridge
 Lomonosov Bridge
 Marble Bridge
 Palace Bridge
 Saint Petersburg Dam
Floods in Saint Petersburg
 Trinity Bridge

Cultural and exhibition centers in Saint Petersburg 
 Kuryokhin Center
 Saint Petersburg Manege

Forts of Saint Petersburg 

 Fort Alexander
 Peter and Paul Fortress
Grand Ducal Burial Vault
Saints Peter and Paul Cathedral
Saint Petersburg Mint

Monuments and memorials in Saint Petersburg 

 Alexander Column
 Bronze Horseman
 Chesme Column
 Column of Glory
 Green Belt of Glory
 Leningrad Hero City Obelisk
 Monument to Nicholas I
 Monument to Peter I (Peter and Paul Fortress)
 Monument to Peter I (St. Michael's Castle)
 Rimsky-Korsakov Monument

Museums and art galleries in Saint Petersburg 

Museums in Saint Petersburg
 Arctic and Antarctic Museum
 ARKA Gallery
 Central Naval Museum
 Dmitry Mendeleev's Memorial Museum Apartment
 Dostoyevsky Museum
 Erarta
Erarta Galleries
 Fabergé Museum in Saint Petersburg
 Grand Maket Rossiya
 Hermitage Museum
Hermitage cats
 Kunstkamera
 Military Historical Museum of Artillery, Engineers and Signal Corps
 Museum of Electrical Transport
 Museum of Political History of Russia
 Museum of Russian Submarine Forces
 National Pushkin Museum
 Rimsky-Korsakov Apartment and Museum
 Russian cruiser Aurora
 Russian Museum
Cabin of Peter the Great
Collections of the Russian Museum
Russian Museum of Ethnography
 Russian Museum of Military Medicine
 Russian Railway Museum
 Saint Petersburg Toy Museum
 State Museum of the History of St. Petersburg
 Stieglitz Museum of Applied Arts
 Suvorov Museum
 V.V. Dokuchaev Central Museum of Soil
 Zoological Museum of the Zoological Institute of the Russian Academy of Sciences

Palaces and villas in Saint Petersburg 

 Alexis Palace
 Anichkov Palace
 Beloselsky-Belozersky Palace
 Gatchina Palace
 Kamenny Island Palace
 Kikin Hall
 Lobanov-Rostovsky Palace
 Marble Palace
 Mariinsky Palace
 Menshikov Palace
 Moika Palace
 Naryshkin-Shuvalov Palace
 Nevsky Prospect 86
 New Michael Palace
 Nicholas Palace
 Oranienbaum
 Pavlovsk Palace
 Peterhof Palace
Monplaisir Palace
Peterhof Grand Palace
 Saint Michael's Castle
 Saltykov Mansion
 Shuvalov Palace
 Stroganov Palace
 Summer Palace
 Summer Palace of Peter the Great
 Tauride Palace
 Tsarskoye Selo
Alexander Palace
Catherine Palace
Amber Room
Kagul Obelisk
Sophia Cathedral
Tsarskoye Selo Lyceum
 Vladimir Palace
 Vorontsov Palace
 Winter Palace
Military Gallery of the Winter Palace
Neva Enfilade of the Winter Palace
Private Apartments of the Winter Palace
 Yelagin Palace

Parks and gardens in Saint Petersburg 

 Alexander Garden
 Alexander Park
 Catherine Park
 Field of Mars
 Maritime Victory Park
 Mikhailovsky Garden
Rossi Pavilion
 Monplaisir Garden
 Moskovsky Victory Park
 Pavlovsk Park
 Saint Petersburg Botanical Garden
 Summer Garden

Public squares in Saint Petersburg 

Public squares in Saint Petersburg
 Manezhnaya Square
 Muzhestva Square
 Palace Square
 Saint Isaac's Square
 Senate Square
 Sennaya Square
 Victory Square
 Vosstaniya Square

Religious buildings in Saint Petersburg 

 Alexander Nevsky Lavra
 Holy Trinity Cathedral of the Alexander Nevsky Lavra
 Ascension Cathedral
 Cathedral of the Assumption of the Blessed Virgin Mary
 Chesme Church
 Church of St. Catherine
 Church of the Epiphany
 Church of the Savior on Blood
 Coastal Monastery of Saint Sergius
 Evangelical Lutheran Church of Saint Mary
 Gothic Chapel
 Ioannovsky Convent
 Kazan Cathedral
 Kronstadt Naval Cathedral
 Lutheran Church of Saint Peter and Saint Paul
 Old Trinity Cathedral
 Sacred Heart Church
 Saint Andrew's Cathedral
 Saint Catherine's Armenian Church
 Saint Isaac's Cathedral
 Saint Sampson's Cathedral
 Saviour Church on Sennaya Square
 Smolny Convent
 St. John the Baptist Church
 St. John's Church
 St. Julian's Church
 St. Nicholas Naval Cathedral
 St. Stanislaus Church
 St. Vladimir's Cathedral
 Transfiguration Cathedral
 Trinity Cathedral
 Vladimirskaya Church

Secular buildings in Saint Petersburg 
 

Buildings and structures in Saint Petersburg

 Admiralty building
 Ciniselli Circus
 Eliseyev Emporium
 Esders and Scheefhaals building
 General Staff Building
 House of Soviets
 Imperial Academy of Arts
 Kotomin House
 Lakhta Center
 Library of the Russian Academy of Sciences
 National Library of Russia
 Old Saint Petersburg Stock Exchange and Rostral Columns
 Pulkovo Observatory
 Pushkin House
 Saint Petersburg City Duma
 Saint Petersburg Commodity and Stock Exchange
 Saint Petersburg Mint
 Singer House
 Smolny Institute
 Tolstoy House
 Twelve Collegia
 Utkina Dacha
 Wawelberg Bank building

Streets in Saint Petersburg 

 Bolshoy Prospekt
 Gorokhovaya Street
 Kamennoostrovsky Prospekt
 Ligovsky Avenue
 Lines of Vasilyevsky Island
 Liteyny Avenue
 Malaya Sadovaya Street
 Millionnaya Street
 Moskovsky Avenue
 Neva embankments
Admiralty Embankment
Lions at the Dvortsovaya pier
English Embankment
Kutuzov Embankment
 Palace Embankment
Universitetskaya Embankment
Quay with Sphinxes
 Nevsky Prospect
 Sadovaya Street

Theatres in Saint Petersburg 

Theatres in Saint Petersburg
 Alexandrinsky Theatre
 Baltic House Festival Theatre
 Bolshoi Theatre
 Hermitage Theatre
 Kamenny Island Theatre
 Komedianty Theatre
 Lensovet Theatre
 Liteiny Theatre
 Mariinsky Theatre
 Mikhailovsky Theatre
 Ostrov Theatre
 Saint Petersburg Comedy Theatre
 Tovstonogov Bolshoi Drama Theater
 Youth Theatre on the Fontanka
 Zazerkalie

Towers in Saint Petersburg 

 Griffins' tower
 Lesnoy Mole Rear Range Light
 Saint Petersburg TV Tower

Triumphal arches in Saint Petersburg    

 Moscow Triumphal Gate
 Narva Triumphal Arch

Demographics of Saint Petersburg 

Demographics of Saint Petersburg

Government and politics of Saint Petersburg 

Politics of Saint Petersburg

 Legislative Assembly of Saint Petersburg
 Saint Petersburg City Administration
 Governor of Saint Petersburg

Law and order in Saint Petersburg 

 Charter of Saint Petersburg
 Saint Petersburg Police

Military in Saint Petersburg 
 Western Military District

History of Saint Petersburg 

History of Saint Petersburg

History of Saint Petersburg, by period or event 

Timeline of Saint Petersburg

 Saint Petersburg during the Imperial Era (1703–1917)
 Founding of Saint Petersburg (1703) – Tsar Peter the Great founded the city on 27 May 1703 after he reconquered the Ingrian land from Sweden, in the Great Northern War. Upon the city's founding, he named the city after his patron saint, the apostle Saint Peter.
 Peter moved the capital from Moscow to Saint Petersburg in 1712.
 After the death of Peter the Great in 1725, Peter II of Russia moved his seat back to Moscow, but in 1732 Saint Petersburg became capital of the Russian Empire for more than two hundred years.
 The Revolution of 1905 began in Saint Petersburg and spread rapidly into the provinces.
 On 1 September 1914, after the outbreak of World War I, the Imperial government renamed the city Petrograd.
 Saint Petersburg during the Revolution and Soviet Era (1917–1941)
 In March 1917, during the February Revolution, Nicholas II abdicated.
 On 7 November 1917, the Bolsheviks led by Vladimir Lenin stormed the Winter Palace in an event known thereafter as the October Revolution. Lenin moved his government to Moscow on 5 March 1918.
 On 26 January 1924, five days after Lenin's death, Petrograd was renamed Leningrad.
 Saint Petersburg during World War II (1941–1945)
 Siege of Leningrad (1941–1944)
 Saint Petersburg during the Soviet Era (1945–1991)
 Leningrad affair (1949–1952) – Stalin had leaders and heroes of the city framed and executed, imprisoned, or exiled to Siberia, due to their popularity, including the mayor.
 Contemporary Era (1991–present)
 On 12 June 1991, after the collapse of the Soviet Union, in a referendum 54% of voters chose to restore "the original name, Saint Petersburg". Original names returned to many streets, bridges, Metro stations and parks.

History of Saint Petersburg, by subject 

 Treaty of Saint Petersburg (1723)
 Treaty of Saint Petersburg (1762)
 Treaty of Saint Petersburg (1805)
 Treaty of Saint Petersburg (1812)
 Treaty of Saint Petersburg (1825)
 Treaty of Saint Petersburg (1834)
 Treaty of Saint Petersburg (1875)
 Treaty of Saint Petersburg (1881)

Culture of Saint Petersburg 

Culture of Saint Petersburg

Arts in Saint Petersburg

Architecture of Saint Petersburg 

Architecture of Saint Petersburg
 Art Nouveau architecture in Saint Petersburg
Singer House
 Baroque architecture in Saint Petersburg
Smolny Convent
Vorontsov Palace
 Fences in Saint Petersburg
 Gothic Revival architecture in Saint Petersburg
Gothic Chapel
 Greek Revival architecture in Saint Petersburg
Old Saint Petersburg Stock Exchange
 Neoclassical architecture in Saint Petersburg
Alexander Palace
General Staff Building
Trinity Cathedral
 Palladian architecture in Saint Petersburg
Smolny Institute
 Petrine Baroque in Saint Petersburg
Menshikov Palace
Twelve Collegia
Saints Peter and Paul Cathedral

Cinema of Saint Petersburg 

 Festival of Festivals
 Saint Petersburg International Film Festival

Literature of Saint Petersburg 
 Fyodor Dostoyevsky
 Crime and Punishment
 The Double
 Nikolai Gogol
The Nose
 Aleksandr Pushkin
 Ivan Turgenev
 National Library of Russia

Music and ballet of Saint Petersburg 

 Ballet of Saint Petersburg
 Mariinsky Ballet
Vaganova Academy of Russian Ballet
 St Petersburg Ballet Theatre

 Music of Saint Petersburg
 Music schools in Saint Petersburg
Saint Petersburg Conservatory 
 Music venues in Saint Petersburg
Mariinsky Theatre
Mikhailovsky Theatre
Saint Petersburg Philharmonia
St. Petersburg Music Hall
 Musical compositions dedicated to Saint Petersburg
Symphony No. 7 (Shostakovich)
 Musical ensembles in Saint Petersburg
Saint Petersburg Academic Symphony Orchestra
Saint Petersburg Court Chapel
Saint Petersburg Philharmonic Orchestra
The Male Choir of St. Petersburg
 Musicians from Saint Petersburg
Alexander Borodin
Victor Ewald
Alexander Glazunov
Alexander Serov
Dmitri Shostakovich
Igor Stravinsky
The Five

Theatre of Saint Petersburg 

 Lensovet Theatre
 Teatralnaya laboratoriya

Visual arts of Saint Petersburg 

 Fine Art of Leningrad
 Leningrad School of Painting
 Painters of Saint Petersburg

Events in Saint Petersburg

 White Nights Festival
Festival of Festivals
Scarlet Sails
White Nights International Marathon

Languages of Saint Petersburg
 Russian language
 Veps language

Media in Saint Petersburg
 Newspapers in Saint Petersburg
The St. Petersburg Times
 Radio and television in Saint Petersburg
 Television and radio stations in Saint Petersburg

People from Saint Petersburg
 List of people from Saint Petersburg
 George Balanchine
 Peter Carl Fabergé
 Ludvig Faddeev
 Mikhail Kutuzov
 Vladimir Nabokov

Religion in Saint Petersburg 

Religion in Saint Petersburg

 Catholicism in Saint Petersburg
Roman Catholic Diocese of Saint Petersburg
 Church of St. Catherine
 Eastern Orthodoxy in Saint Petersburg
 Transfiguration Cathedral
 Russian Orthodoxy in Saint Petersburg
 Russian Orthodox Church
 Buddhism in Saint Petersburg
Datsan Gunzechoinei
 Islam in Saint Petersburg
 Saint Petersburg Mosque
 Judaism in Saint Petersburg
 Grand Choral Synagogue

Sports in Saint Petersburg 

Sport in Saint Petersburg
 Basketball in Saint Petersburg
 BC Spartak Saint Petersburg
 B.C. Zenit Saint Petersburg

 Football in Saint Petersburg
 Association football in Saint Petersburg
 FC Dynamo Saint Petersburg
 FC Zenit Saint Petersburg
 Saint Petersburg derby

 Ice hockey in Saint Petersburg
 HC Dinamo Saint Petersburg
 SKA Saint Petersburg

 Sports competitions in Saint Petersburg
 2006–07 Grand Prix of Figure Skating Final
 Leningrad City Chess Championship
 St. Petersburg Open
 White Nights Marathon

 Sports venues in Saint Petersburg
 Ice Palace
 Krestovsky Stadium
 Petrovsky Stadium
 Saint Petersburg Sports and Concert Complex
 Yubileyny Sports Palace

Economy and infrastructure of Saint Petersburg 

 

Economy of Saint Petersburg
 Financial services in Saint Petersburg
 Bank Saint Petersburg
 Saint Petersburg Stock Exchange

 Hotels in Saint Petersburg
 Angleterre Hotel
 Corinthia Hotel St. Petersburg
 Grand Hotel Europe
 Hotel Astoria
 Four Seasons Hotel Lion Palace
 Oktyabrskaya Hotel
 Saint Petersburg

 Restaurants and cafés in Saint Petersburg
 Literaturnoye Kafe

 Shipbuilding industry
Admiralty Shipyard
Almaz Shipbuilding Company
 
  Shopping malls and markets in Saint Petersburg
 Shopping malls in Saint Petersburg
DLT 
Galeria
Great Gostiny Dvor
Passage

 Tourism in Saint Petersburg
 Landmarks of Saint Petersburg

Transportation in Saint Petersburg 
 

Transportation in Saint Petersburg
 Public transport in Saint Petersburg
 Public transport operators in Saint Petersburg
 Air transport in Saint Petersburg
 Airports in Saint Petersburg
Pulkovo Airport
 Maritime transport in Saint Petersburg
 Ports and harbours in Saint Petersburg
Big port Saint Petersburg
Passenger Port of St. Petersburg
 Shipping lines serving Saint Petersburg
 Baltic Sea Shipping Company
 Road transport in Saint Petersburg
 Bus transport in Saint Petersburg
 Central Arc Thoroughfare 
 Saint Petersburg Ring Road

Rail transport in Saint Petersburg 

Rail transport in Saint Petersburg
 Railway stations in Saint Petersburg
 Baltiysky railway station
 Finland Station
Riihimäki–Saint Petersburg railway
 Ladozhsky railway station
 Moskovsky railway station
 Vitebsky railway station
  Saint Petersburg Metro
 
 
 
 
 
List of Saint Petersburg Metro stations
 Trams in Saint Petersburg
Vasileostrovsky tram depot

Education in Saint Petersburg 

Education in Saint Petersburg
 Primary schools in Saint Petersburg
 St Petersburg Classical Gymnasium
 Secondary schools in Saint Petersburg
 Karl May School
 Saint Peter's School
 Saint Petersburg Lyceum 30
 Saint Petersburg Lyceum 239
 The Second Saint Petersburg Gymnasium
 Tavricheskaya Art School
 Higher education and academic institutions in Saint Petersburg
 Music schools
Kikin Hall
Saint Petersburg Conservatory
 Universities in Saint Petersburg
Herzen University
Peter the Great St. Petersburg Polytechnic University
Saint Petersburg State University
Saint-Petersburg State University of Architecture and Civil Engineering
Saint-Petersburg State University of Culture and Arts
Saint Petersburg State University of Economics and Finance
 Research institutes in Saint Petersburg
Arctic and Antarctic Research Institute
Bekhterev Psychoneurological Institute
Komarov Botanical Institute
Krylov State Research Center

Healthcare in Saint Petersburg 

 Hospitals in Saint Petersburg
 City hospital No. 40

See also 

 Outline of geography

References

External links 

Saint Petersburg
Saint Petersburg